Sarcosine, also known as N-methylglycine, or monomethylglycine, is a amino acid with the formula CH3N(H)CH2CO2H.  It exists at neutral pH as the zwitterion CH3N+(H)2CH2CO2−, which can be obtained as a white, water-soluble powder.  Like some amino acids, sarcosine converts to a cation at low pH and an anion at high pH, with the respective formulas CH3N+(H)2CH2CO2H and CH3N(H)CH2CO2−.  Sarcosine is a close relative of glycine, with a secondary amine in place of the primary amine.

Sarcosine is ubiquitous in biological materials.  It is used in manufacturing biodegradable surfactants and toothpastes as well as in other applications. It is also a reagent in organic synthesis.

Sarcosine is sweet to the taste.

Biochemistry
Sarcosine is an intermediate and byproduct in glycine synthesis and degradation. Sarcosine is metabolized to glycine by the enzyme sarcosine dehydrogenase, while glycine-N-methyl transferase generates sarcosine from glycine. Sarcosine is an amino acid derivative that is naturally found in muscles and other body tissues. In the laboratory, it may be synthesized from chloroacetic acid and methylamine. Sarcosine is an intermediate in the metabolism of choline to glycine. 
 
Sarcosine, like the related compounds dimethylglycine (DMG) and trimethylglycine (betaine, TMG), is formed via the metabolism of nutrients such as choline and methionine, which both contain methyl groups used in a wide range of biochemical reactions. Sarcosine is rapidly degraded to glycine, which, in addition to its importance as a constituent of protein, plays a significant role in various physiological processes as a prime metabolic source of components of living cells such as glutathione, creatine, purines and serine. The concentration of sarcosine in blood serum of normal human subjects is 1.4 ± 0.6 micromolar.

Industrial synthesis
Sarcosine can be produced industrially via the Strecker amino acid synthesis.

Surfactants
A variety of surfactants are produced from sarcosine, for instance sodium lauroyl sarcosinate.

Clinical investigations
Early evidence suggests sarcosine is an effective and well-tolerated adjuvant to many antipsychotics except clozapine for the treatment of schizophrenia, showing significant reductions in both positive and negative symptoms. 
Sarcosine has also been debated as a biomarker for prostate cancer cells.

History
Sarcosine was first isolated and named by the German chemist Justus von Liebig in 1847.

Jacob Volhard first synthesized it in 1862 while working in the lab of Hermann Kolbe.  Prior to the synthesis of sarcosine, it had long been known to be a hydrolysis product of creatine, a compound found in meat extract.  Under this assumption, by preparing the compound with methylamine and monochloroacetic acid, Volhard proved that sarcosine was N-methylglycine.

See also 
 Glycine
 Dimethylglycine
 Trimethylglycine
Oncometabolism

References 

Glycine reuptake inhibitors
Glycine receptor agonists